In mathematics, Hilbert spaces (named after David Hilbert) allow generalizing the methods of linear algebra and calculus from (finite-dimensional) Euclidean vector spaces to spaces that may be infinite-dimensional. Hilbert spaces arise naturally and frequently in mathematics and physics, typically as function spaces. Formally, a Hilbert space is a vector space equipped with an inner product that defines a distance function for which the space is a complete metric space. 

The earliest Hilbert spaces were studied from this point of view in the first decade of the 20th century by David Hilbert, Erhard Schmidt, and Frigyes Riesz. They are indispensable tools in the theories of partial differential equations, quantum mechanics, Fourier analysis (which includes applications to signal processing and heat transfer), and ergodic theory (which forms the mathematical underpinning of thermodynamics). John von Neumann coined the term Hilbert space for the abstract concept that underlies many of these diverse applications. The success of Hilbert space methods ushered in a very fruitful era for functional analysis. Apart from the classical Euclidean vector spaces, examples of Hilbert spaces include spaces of square-integrable functions, spaces of sequences, Sobolev spaces consisting of generalized functions, and Hardy spaces of holomorphic functions.

Geometric intuition plays an important role in many aspects of Hilbert space theory. Exact analogs of the Pythagorean theorem and parallelogram law hold in a Hilbert space. At a deeper level, perpendicular projection onto a linear subspace or a subspace (the analog of "dropping the altitude" of a triangle) plays a significant role in optimization problems and other aspects of the theory. An element of a Hilbert space can be uniquely specified by its coordinates with respect to an orthonormal basis, in analogy with Cartesian coordinates in classical geometry. When this basis is countably infinite, it allows identifying the Hilbert space with the space of the infinite sequences that are square-summable. The latter space is often in the older literature referred to as the Hilbert space.

Definition and illustration

Motivating example: Euclidean vector space

The dot product satisfies the properties:

An operation on pairs of vectors that, like the dot product, satisfies these three properties is known as a (real) inner product. A vector space equipped with such an inner product is known as a (real) inner product space. Every finite-dimensional inner product space is also a Hilbert space.

Multivariable calculus in Euclidean space relies on the ability to compute limits, and to have useful criteria for concluding that limits exist. A mathematical series

Just as with a series of scalars, a series of vectors that converges absolutely also converges to some limit vector  in the Euclidean space, in the sense that

This property expresses the completeness of Euclidean space: that a series that converges absolutely also converges in the ordinary sense.

Hilbert spaces are often taken over the complex numbers.

If  is a decomposition of  into its real and imaginary parts, then the modulus is the usual Euclidean two-dimensional length:

This is complex-valued. The real part of  gives the usual two-dimensional Euclidean dot product.

A second example is the space  whose elements are pairs of complex numbers .

Definition
A   is a real or complex inner product space that is also a complete metric space with respect to the distance function induced by the inner product.

To say that  is a  means that  is a complex vector space on which there is an inner product  associating a complex number to each pair of elements  of  that satisfies the following properties:
 The inner product is conjugate symmetric; that is, the inner product of a pair of elements is equal to the complex conjugate of the inner product of the swapped elements:  Importantly, this implies that  is a real number.
 The inner product is linear in its first argument. For all complex numbers  and  
 The inner product of an element with itself is positive definite: 

A  is defined in the same way, except that  is a real vector space and the inner product takes real values. Such an inner product will be a bilinear map and  will form a dual system.

The norm is the real-valued function

This last property is ultimately a consequence of the more fundamental Cauchy–Schwarz inequality, which asserts

Any pre-Hilbert space that is additionally also a complete space is a Hilbert space.

Completeness can be characterized by the following equivalent condition: if a series of vectors

converges absolutely in the sense that

As a complete normed space, Hilbert spaces are by definition also Banach spaces. As such they are topological vector spaces, in which topological notions like the openness and closedness of subsets are well defined. Of special importance is the notion of a closed linear subspace of a Hilbert space that, with the inner product induced by restriction, is also complete (being a closed set in a complete metric space) and therefore a Hilbert space in its own right.

Second example: sequence spaces
The sequence space  consists of all infinite sequences  of complex numbers such that the following series converges:

This second series converges as a consequence of the Cauchy–Schwarz inequality and the convergence of the previous series.

The proof is basic in mathematical analysis, and permits mathematical series of elements of the space to be manipulated with the same ease as series of complex numbers (or vectors in a finite-dimensional Euclidean space).

History

Prior to the development of Hilbert spaces, other generalizations of Euclidean spaces were known to mathematicians and physicists. In particular, the idea of an abstract linear space (vector space) had gained some traction towards the end of the 19th century: this is a space whose elements can be added together and multiplied by scalars (such as real or complex numbers) without necessarily identifying these elements with "geometric" vectors, such as position and momentum vectors in physical systems. Other objects studied by mathematicians at the turn of the 20th century, in particular spaces of sequences (including series) and spaces of functions, can naturally be thought of as linear spaces. Functions, for instance, can be added together or multiplied by constant scalars, and these operations obey the algebraic laws satisfied by addition and scalar multiplication of spatial vectors.

In the first decade of the 20th century, parallel developments led to the introduction of Hilbert spaces.

 

which has many of the familiar properties of the Euclidean dot product. In particular, the idea of an orthogonal family of functions has meaning. Schmidt exploited the similarity of this inner product with the usual dot product to prove an analog of the spectral decomposition for an operator of the form

 

The resulting eigenfunction expansion expresses the function  as a series of the form

 

where the functions  are orthogonal in the sense that  for all . The individual terms in this series are sometimes referred to as elementary product solutions. However, there are eigenfunction expansions that fail to converge in a suitable sense to a square-integrable function: the missing ingredient, which ensures convergence, is completeness.

The second development was the Lebesgue integral, an alternative to the Riemann integral introduced by Henri Lebesgue in 1904. The Lebesgue integral made it possible to integrate a much broader class of functions. In 1907, Frigyes Riesz and Ernst Sigismund Fischer independently proved that the space  of square Lebesgue-integrable functions is a complete metric space. As a consequence of the interplay between geometry and completeness, the 19th century results of Joseph Fourier, Friedrich Bessel and Marc-Antoine Parseval on trigonometric series easily carried over to these more general spaces, resulting in a geometrical and analytical apparatus now usually known as the Riesz–Fischer theorem.

Further basic results were proved in the early 20th century. For example, the Riesz representation theorem was independently established by Maurice Fréchet and Frigyes Riesz in 1907. John von Neumann coined the term abstract Hilbert space in his work on unbounded Hermitian operators. Although other mathematicians such as Hermann Weyl and Norbert Wiener had already studied particular Hilbert spaces in great detail, often from a physically motivated point of view, von Neumann gave the first complete and axiomatic treatment of them. Von Neumann later used them in his seminal work on the foundations of quantum mechanics, and in his continued work with Eugene Wigner. The name "Hilbert space" was soon adopted by others, for example by Hermann Weyl in his book on quantum mechanics and the theory of groups.

The significance of the concept of a Hilbert space was underlined with the realization that it offers one of the best mathematical formulations of quantum mechanics. In short, the states of a quantum mechanical system are vectors in a certain Hilbert space, the observables are hermitian operators on that space, the symmetries of the system are unitary operators, and measurements are orthogonal projections. The relation between quantum mechanical symmetries and unitary operators provided an impetus for the development of the unitary representation theory of groups, initiated in the 1928 work of Hermann Weyl. On the other hand, in the early 1930s it became clear that classical mechanics can be described in terms of Hilbert space (Koopman–von Neumann classical mechanics) and that certain properties of classical dynamical systems can be analyzed using Hilbert space techniques in the framework of ergodic theory.

The algebra of observables in quantum mechanics is naturally an algebra of operators defined on a Hilbert space, according to Werner Heisenberg's matrix mechanics formulation of quantum theory. Von Neumann began investigating operator algebras in the 1930s, as rings of operators on a Hilbert space. The kind of algebras studied by von Neumann and his contemporaries are now known as von Neumann algebras. In the 1940s, Israel Gelfand, Mark Naimark and Irving Segal gave a definition of a kind of operator algebras called C*-algebras that on the one hand made no reference to an underlying Hilbert space, and on the other extrapolated many of the useful features of the operator algebras that had previously been studied. The spectral theorem for self-adjoint operators in particular that underlies much of the existing Hilbert space theory was generalized to C*-algebras. These techniques are now basic in abstract harmonic analysis and representation theory.

Examples

Lebesgue spaces

and where functions are identified if and only if they differ only on a set of measure zero.

 or 

where the second form (conjugation of the first element) is commonly found in the theoretical physics literature. Equipped with this inner product,  is in fact complete. The Lebesgue integral is essential to ensure completeness: on domains of real numbers, for instance, not enough functions are Riemann integrable.

The Lebesgue spaces appear in many natural settings. In other situations, the measure may be something other than the ordinary Lebesgue measure on the real line. For instance, if  is any positive measurable function, the space of all measurable functions  on the interval  satisfying

The inner product is defined by

The weighted space  is identical with the Hilbert space  where the measure  of a Lebesgue-measurable set  is defined by

Weighted  spaces like this are frequently used to study orthogonal polynomials, because different families of orthogonal polynomials are orthogonal with respect to different weighting functions.

Sobolev spaces
These are a special kind of function space in which differentiation may be performed, but that (unlike other Banach spaces such as the Hölder spaces) support the structure of an inner product. Because differentiation is permitted, Sobolev spaces are a convenient setting for the theory of partial differential equations. They also form the basis of the theory of direct methods in the calculus of variations.

where the dot indicates the dot product in the Euclidean space of partial derivatives of each order. Sobolev spaces can also be defined when  is not an integer.

Sobolev spaces are also studied from the point of view of spectral theory, relying more specifically on the Hilbert space structure. If  is a suitable domain, then one can define the Sobolev space  as the space of Bessel potentials; roughly,

Apart from providing a workable definition of Sobolev spaces for non-integer , this definition also has particularly desirable properties under the Fourier transform that make it ideal for the study of pseudodifferential operators. Using these methods on a compact Riemannian manifold, one can obtain for instance the Hodge decomposition, which is the basis of Hodge theory.

Spaces of holomorphic functions

Hardy spaces
The Hardy spaces are function spaces, arising in complex analysis and harmonic analysis, whose elements are certain holomorphic functions in a complex domain. Let  denote the unit disc in the complex plane. Then the Hardy space  is defined as the space of holomorphic functions  on  such that the means

The norm on this Hardy space is defined by

Hardy spaces in the disc are related to Fourier series. A function  is in  if and only if

where

Thus  consists of those functions that are L2 on the circle, and whose negative frequency Fourier coefficients vanish.

Bergman spaces
The Bergman spaces are another family of Hilbert spaces of holomorphic functions.

which in turn follows from Cauchy's integral formula. Thus convergence of a sequence of holomorphic functions in  implies also compact convergence, and so the limit function is also holomorphic. Thus, for every , there is a function  such that

for all . The integrand

This integral kernel satisfies a reproducing property

A Bergman space is an example of a reproducing kernel Hilbert space, which is a Hilbert space of functions along with a kernel  that verifies a reproducing property analogous to this one. The Hardy space  also admits a reproducing kernel, known as the Szegő kernel. Reproducing kernels are common in other areas of mathematics as well. For instance, in harmonic analysis the Poisson kernel is a reproducing kernel for the Hilbert space of square-integrable harmonic functions in the unit ball. That the latter is a Hilbert space at all is a consequence of the mean value theorem for harmonic functions.

Applications
Many of the applications of Hilbert spaces exploit the fact that Hilbert spaces support generalizations of simple geometric concepts like projection and change of basis from their usual finite dimensional setting. In particular, the spectral theory of continuous self-adjoint linear operators on a Hilbert space generalizes the usual spectral decomposition of a matrix, and this often plays a major role in applications of the theory to other areas of mathematics and physics.

Sturm–Liouville theory

In the theory of ordinary differential equations, spectral methods on a suitable Hilbert space are used to study the behavior of eigenvalues and eigenfunctions of differential equations. For example, the Sturm–Liouville problem arises in the study of the harmonics of waves in a violin string or a drum, and is a central problem in ordinary differential equations. The problem is a differential equation of the form

for an unknown function  on an interval , satisfying general homogeneous Robin boundary conditions

Furthermore, another consequence of this general result is that the eigenvalues  of the system can be arranged in an increasing sequence tending to infinity.

Partial differential equations
Hilbert spaces form a basic tool in the study of partial differential equations. For many classes of partial differential equations, such as linear elliptic equations, it is possible to consider a generalized solution (known as a weak solution) by enlarging the class of functions. Many weak formulations involve the class of Sobolev functions, which is a Hilbert space. A suitable weak formulation reduces to a geometrical problem the analytic problem of finding a solution or, often what is more important, showing that a solution exists and is unique for given boundary data. For linear elliptic equations, one geometrical result that ensures unique solvability for a large class of problems is the Lax–Milgram theorem. This strategy forms the rudiment of the Galerkin method (a finite element method) for numerical solution of partial differential equations.

The weak formulation consists of finding a function  such that, for all continuously differentiable functions  in  vanishing on the boundary:

The question then reduces to finding  in this space such that for all  in this space

Since the Poisson equation is elliptic, it follows from Poincaré's inequality that the bilinear form  is coercive. The Lax–Milgram theorem then ensures the existence and uniqueness of solutions of this equation.

Hilbert spaces allow for many elliptic partial differential equations to be formulated in a similar way, and the Lax–Milgram theorem is then a basic tool in their analysis. With suitable modifications, similar techniques can be applied to parabolic partial differential equations and certain hyperbolic partial differential equations.

Ergodic theory

The field of ergodic theory is the study of the long-term behavior of chaotic dynamical systems. The protypical case of a field that ergodic theory applies to is thermodynamics, in which—though the microscopic state of a system is extremely complicated (it is impossible to understand the ensemble of individual collisions between particles of matter)—the average behavior over sufficiently long time intervals is tractable. The laws of thermodynamics are assertions about such average behavior. In particular, one formulation of the zeroth law of thermodynamics asserts that over sufficiently long timescales, the only functionally independent measurement that one can make of a thermodynamic system in equilibrium is its total energy, in the form of temperature.

An ergodic dynamical system is one for which, apart from the energy—measured by the Hamiltonian—there are no other functionally independent conserved quantities on the phase space. More explicitly, suppose that the energy  is fixed, and let  be the subset of the phase space consisting of all states of energy  (an energy surface), and let  denote the evolution operator on the phase space. The dynamical system is ergodic if there are no continuous non-constant functions on  such that

Liouville's theorem implies that there exists a measure  on the energy surface that is invariant under the time translation. As a result, time translation is a unitary transformation of the Hilbert space  consisting of square-integrable functions on the energy surface  with respect to the inner product

The von Neumann mean ergodic theorem states the following:

For an ergodic system, the fixed set of the time evolution consists only of the constant functions, so the ergodic theorem implies the following: for any function ,

That is, the long time average of an observable  is equal to its expectation value over an energy surface.

Fourier analysis

One of the basic goals of Fourier analysis is to decompose a function into a (possibly infinite) linear combination of given basis functions: the associated Fourier series. The classical Fourier series associated to a function  defined on the interval  is a series of the form

where

The example of adding up the first few terms in a Fourier series for a sawtooth function is shown in the figure. All basis functions have nodes at the nodes of the sawtooth, but all but the fundamental have additional nodes. The oscillation of the summed terms about the sawtooth is called the Gibbs phenomenon.

A significant problem in classical Fourier series asks in what sense the Fourier series converges, if at all, to the function . Hilbert space methods provide one possible answer to this question. The functions  form an orthogonal basis of the Hilbert space . Consequently, any square-integrable function can be expressed as a series

and, moreover, this series converges in the Hilbert space sense (that is, in the  mean).

The problem can also be studied from the abstract point of view: every Hilbert space has an orthonormal basis, and every element of the Hilbert space can be written in a unique way as a sum of multiples of these basis elements. The coefficients appearing on these basis elements are sometimes known abstractly as the Fourier coefficients of the element of the space. In many circumstances, it is desirable not to decompose a function into trigonometric functions, but rather into orthogonal polynomials or wavelets for instance, and in higher dimensions into spherical harmonics.

The coefficients  are selected to make the magnitude of the difference  as small as possible.

That this formula minimizes the difference  is a consequence of Bessel's inequality and Parseval's formula.

In various applications to physical problems, a function can be decomposed into physically meaningful eigenfunctions of a differential operator (typically the Laplace operator): this forms the foundation for the spectral study of functions, in reference to the spectrum of the differential operator. A concrete physical application involves the problem of hearing the shape of a drum: given the fundamental modes of vibration that a drumhead is capable of producing, can one infer the shape of the drum itself? The mathematical formulation of this question involves the Dirichlet eigenvalues of the Laplace equation in the plane, that represent the fundamental modes of vibration in direct analogy with the integers that represent the fundamental modes of vibration of the violin string.

Spectral theory also underlies certain aspects of the Fourier transform of a function. Whereas Fourier analysis decomposes a function defined on a compact set into the discrete spectrum of the Laplacian (which corresponds to the vibrations of a violin string or drum), the Fourier transform of a function is the decomposition of a function defined on all of Euclidean space into its components in the continuous spectrum of the Laplacian. The Fourier transformation is also geometrical, in a sense made precise by the Plancherel theorem, that asserts that it is an isometry of one Hilbert space (the "time domain") with another (the "frequency domain"). This isometry property of the Fourier transformation is a recurring theme in abstract harmonic analysis (since it reflects the conservation of energy for the continuous Fourier Transform), as evidenced for instance by the Plancherel theorem for spherical functions occurring in noncommutative harmonic analysis.

Quantum mechanics

In the mathematically rigorous formulation of quantum mechanics, developed by John von Neumann, the possible states (more precisely, the pure states) of a quantum mechanical system are represented by unit vectors (called state vectors) residing in a complex separable Hilbert space, known as the state space, well defined up to a complex number of norm 1 (the phase factor). In other words, the possible states are points in the projectivization of a Hilbert space, usually called the complex projective space. The exact nature of this Hilbert space is dependent on the system; for example, the position and momentum states for a single non-relativistic spin zero particle is the space of all square-integrable functions, while the states for the spin of a single proton are unit elements of the two-dimensional complex Hilbert space of spinors. Each observable is represented by a self-adjoint linear operator acting on the state space. Each eigenstate of an observable corresponds to an eigenvector of the operator, and the associated eigenvalue corresponds to the value of the observable in that eigenstate.

The inner product between two state vectors is a complex number known as a probability amplitude. During an ideal measurement of a quantum mechanical system, the probability that a system collapses from a given initial state to a particular eigenstate is given by the square of the absolute value of the probability amplitudes between the initial and final states. The possible results of a measurement are the eigenvalues of the operator—which explains the choice of self-adjoint operators, for all the eigenvalues must be real. The probability distribution of an observable in a given state can be found by computing the spectral decomposition of the corresponding operator.

For a general system, states are typically not pure, but instead are represented as statistical mixtures of pure states, or mixed states, given by density matrices: self-adjoint operators of trace one on a Hilbert space. Moreover, for general quantum mechanical systems, the effects of a single measurement can influence other parts of a system in a manner that is described instead by a positive operator valued measure. Thus the structure both of the states and observables in the general theory is considerably more complicated than the idealization for pure states.

Color perception

Any true physical color can be represented by a combination of pure spectral colors. As physical colors can be composed of any number of spectral colors, the space of physical colors may aptly be represented by a Hilbert space over spectral colors. Humans have three types of cone cells for color perception, so the perceivable colors can be represented by 3-dimensional Euclidean space. The many-to-one linear mapping from the Hilbert space of physical colors to the Euclidean space of human perceivable colors explains why many distinct physical colors may be perceived by humans to be identical (e.g., pure yellow light versus a mix of red and green light, see metamerism).

Properties

Pythagorean identity

Whereas the Pythagorean identity as stated is valid in any inner product space, completeness is required for the extension of the Pythagorean identity to series. A series  of orthogonal vectors converges in  if and only if the series of squares of norms converges, and

Furthermore, the sum of a series of orthogonal vectors is independent of the order in which it is taken.

Parallelogram identity and polarization

By definition, every Hilbert space is also a Banach space. Furthermore, in every Hilbert space the following parallelogram identity holds:

Conversely, every Banach space in which the parallelogram identity holds is a Hilbert space, and the inner product is uniquely determined by the norm by the polarization identity. For real Hilbert spaces, the polarization identity is

For complex Hilbert spaces, it is

The parallelogram law implies that any Hilbert space is a uniformly convex Banach space.

Best approximation
This subsection employs the Hilbert projection theorem.

This is equivalent to saying that there is a point with minimal norm in the translated convex set . The proof consists in showing that every minimizing sequence  is Cauchy (using the parallelogram identity) hence converges (using completeness) to a point in  that has minimal norm. More generally, this holds in any uniformly convex Banach space.

This point  is the orthogonal projection of  onto , and the mapping  is linear (see Orthogonal complements and projections). This result is especially significant in applied mathematics, especially numerical analysis, where it forms the basis of least squares methods.

Duality
The dual space  is the space of all continuous linear functions from the space  into the base field. It carries a natural norm, defined by

This norm satisfies the parallelogram law, and so the dual space is also an inner product space where this inner product can be defined in terms of this dual norm by using the polarization identity. The dual space is also complete so it is a Hilbert space in its own right. 
If  is a complete orthonormal basis for  then the inner product on the dual space of any two  is

where all but countably many of the terms in this series are zero.

The Riesz representation theorem affords a convenient description of the dual space.

where moreover, 

So to every element  of the dual  there exists one and only one  in  such that

for all . The inner product on the dual space  satisfies

The representing vector  is obtained in the following way. The requirement that  yields

This correspondence  is exploited by the bra–ket notation popular in physics.

The result  can be seen as the action of the linear functional  (the bra) on the vector  (the ket).

The Riesz representation theorem relies fundamentally not just on the presence of an inner product, but also on the completeness of the space. In fact, the theorem implies that the topological dual of any inner product space can be identified with its completion. An immediate consequence of the Riesz representation theorem is also that a Hilbert space  is reflexive, meaning that the natural map from  into its double dual space is an isomorphism.

Weakly-convergent sequences

In a Hilbert space , a sequence  is weakly convergent to a vector  when

for every .

For example, any orthonormal sequence  converges weakly to 0, as a consequence of Bessel's inequality. Every weakly convergent sequence  is bounded, by the uniform boundedness principle.

Conversely, every bounded sequence in a Hilbert space admits weakly convergent subsequences (Alaoglu's theorem). Among several variants, one simple statement is as follows:

This fact (and its various generalizations) are fundamental for direct methods in the calculus of variations. Minimization results for convex functionals are also a direct consequence of the slightly more abstract fact that closed bounded convex subsets in a Hilbert space  are weakly compact, since  is reflexive. The existence of weakly convergent subsequences is a special case of the Eberlein–Šmulian theorem.

Banach space properties
Any general property of Banach spaces continues to hold for Hilbert spaces. The open mapping theorem states that a continuous surjective linear transformation from one Banach space to another is an open mapping meaning that it sends open sets to open sets. A corollary is the bounded inverse theorem, that a continuous and bijective linear function from one Banach space to another is an isomorphism (that is, a continuous linear map whose inverse is also continuous). This theorem is considerably simpler to prove in the case of Hilbert spaces than in general Banach spaces. The open mapping theorem is equivalent to the closed graph theorem, which asserts that a linear function from one Banach space to another is continuous if and only if its graph is a closed set. In the case of Hilbert spaces, this is basic in the study of unbounded operators (see closed operator).

The (geometrical) Hahn–Banach theorem asserts that a closed convex set can be separated from any point outside it by means of a hyperplane of the Hilbert space.

Operators on Hilbert spaces

Bounded operators
The continuous linear operators  from a Hilbert space  to a second Hilbert space  are bounded in the sense that they map bounded sets to bounded sets. Conversely, if an operator is bounded, then it is continuous. The space of such bounded linear operators has a norm, the operator norm given by

The sum and the composite of two bounded linear operators is again bounded and linear.

The adjoint satisfies .

The set of self adjoint operators admits a partial order, in which  if . A converse is also true in the sense that, for a non-negative operator , there exists a unique non-negative square root  such that

In a sense made precise by the spectral theorem, self-adjoint operators can usefully be thought of as operators that are "real". Normal operators decompose into the sum of a self-adjoint operator and an imaginary multiple of a self adjoint operator

that commute with each other. Normal operators can also usefully be thought of in terms of their real and imaginary parts.

Equivalently, a bounded operator  is compact if, for any bounded sequence , the sequence  has a convergent subsequence. Many integral operators are compact, and in fact define a special class of operators known as Hilbert–Schmidt operators that are especially important in the study of integral equations. Fredholm operators differ from a compact operator by a multiple of the identity, and are equivalently characterized as operators with a finite dimensional kernel and cokernel. The index of a Fredholm operator  is defined by

The index is homotopy invariant, and plays a deep role in differential geometry via the Atiyah–Singer index theorem.

Unbounded operators
Unbounded operators are also tractable in Hilbert spaces, and have important applications to quantum mechanics.

The adjoint of a densely defined unbounded operator is defined in essentially the same manner as for bounded operators. Self-adjoint unbounded operators play the role of the observables in the mathematical formulation of quantum mechanics. Examples of self-adjoint unbounded operators on the Hilbert space  are:
 The multiplication-by- operator: 

These correspond to the momentum and position observables, respectively.

Constructions

Direct sums
Two Hilbert spaces  and  can be combined into another Hilbert space, called the (orthogonal) direct sum, and denoted

consists of the set of all indexed families

in the Cartesian product of the  such that

The inner product is defined by

A direct sum (internal or external) is also equipped with a family of orthogonal projections  onto the th direct summand . These projections are bounded, self-adjoint, idempotent operators that satisfy the orthogonality condition

The spectral theorem for compact self-adjoint operators on a Hilbert space  states that  splits into an orthogonal direct sum of the eigenspaces of an operator, and also gives an explicit decomposition of the operator as a sum of projections onto the eigenspaces. The direct sum of Hilbert spaces also appears in quantum mechanics as the Fock space of a system containing a variable number of particles, where each Hilbert space in the direct sum corresponds to an additional degree of freedom for the quantum mechanical system. In representation theory, the Peter–Weyl theorem guarantees that any unitary representation of a compact group on a Hilbert space splits as the direct sum of finite-dimensional representations.

Tensor products

On simple tensors, let

An example is provided by the Hilbert space . This isomorphism sends a simple tensor  to the function

on the square.

This example is typical in the following sense.

Orthonormal bases
The notion of an orthonormal basis from linear algebra generalizes over to the case of Hilbert spaces. In a Hilbert space , an orthonormal basis is a family  of elements of  satisfying the conditions:
 Normalization: Every element of the family has norm 1:  for all .

A system of vectors satisfying the first two conditions basis is called an orthonormal system or an orthonormal set (or an orthonormal sequence if  is countable). Such a system is always linearly independent. 

Despite the name, an orthonormal basis is not, in general, a basis in the sense of linear algebra (Hamel basis). More precisely, an orthonormal basis is a Hamel basis if and only if the Hilbert space is a finite-dimensional vector space.

Completeness of an orthonormal system of vectors of a Hilbert space can be equivalently restated as:

 for every , if  for all , then .

Examples of orthonormal bases include:
 the sequence  with  forms an orthonormal basis of the complex space ;

In the infinite-dimensional case, an orthonormal basis will not be a basis in the sense of linear algebra; to distinguish the two, the latter basis is also called a Hamel basis. That the span of the basis vectors is dense implies that every vector in the space can be written as the sum of an infinite series, and the orthogonality implies that this decomposition is unique.

Sequence spaces
The space  of square-summable sequences of complex numbers is the set of infinite sequences

of real or complex numbers such that

This space has an orthonormal basis:

This space is the infinite-dimensional generalization of the  space of finite-dimensional vectors. It is usually the first example used to show that in infinite-dimensional spaces, a set that is closed and bounded is not necessarily (sequentially) compact (as is the case in all finite dimensional spaces). Indeed, the set of orthonormal vectors above shows this: It is an infinite sequence of vectors in the unit ball (i.e., the ball of points with norm less than or equal one). Intuitively, this is because "there is always another coordinate direction" into which the next elements of the sequence can evade.

One can generalize the space  in many ways. For example, if  is any (infinite) set, then one can form a Hilbert space of sequences with index set , defined by

The summation over B is here defined by

the supremum being taken over all finite subsets of . It follows that, for this sum to be finite, every element of  has only countably many nonzero terms. This space becomes a Hilbert space with the inner product

for all . Here the sum also has only countably many nonzero terms, and is unconditionally convergent by the Cauchy–Schwarz inequality.

Bessel's inequality and Parseval's formula
Let  be a finite orthonormal system in . For an arbitrary vector , let

Then  for every . It follows that  is orthogonal to each , hence  is orthogonal to . Using the Pythagorean identity twice, it follows that

Let , be an arbitrary orthonormal system in . Applying the preceding inequality to every finite subset  of  gives Bessel's inequality:

(according to the definition of the sum of an arbitrary family of non-negative real numbers).

In two dimensions, this is the assertion that the length of the leg of a right triangle may not exceed the length of the hypotenuse.

Bessel's inequality is a stepping stone to the stronger result called Parseval's identity, which governs the case when Bessel's inequality is actually an equality.

Even if  is uncountable, Bessel's inequality guarantees that the expression is well-defined and consists only of countably many nonzero terms. Parseval's identity then asserts that

Conversely, if  is an orthonormal set such that Parseval's identity holds for every , then  is an orthonormal basis.

Hilbert dimension
As a consequence of Zorn's lemma, every Hilbert space admits an orthonormal basis; furthermore, any two orthonormal bases of the same space have the same cardinality, called the Hilbert dimension of the space.

The Hilbert dimension is not greater than the Hamel dimension (the usual dimension of a vector space). The two dimensions are equal if and only one is finite.

for all . Thus every Hilbert space is isometrically isomorphic to a sequence space  for some set .

Separable spaces
By definition, a Hilbert space is separable provided it contains a dense countable subset. Along with Zorn's lemma, this means a Hilbert space is separable if and only if it admits a countable orthonormal basis.

In the past, Hilbert spaces were often required to be separable as part of the definition.

In quantum field theory 
Most spaces used in physics are separable, and since these are all isomorphic to each other, one often refers to any infinite-dimensional separable Hilbert space as "the Hilbert space" or just "Hilbert space". Even in quantum field theory, most of the Hilbert spaces are in fact separable, as stipulated by the Wightman axioms. However, it is sometimes argued that non-separable Hilbert spaces are also important in quantum field theory, roughly because the systems in the theory possess an infinite number of degrees of freedom and any infinite Hilbert tensor product (of spaces of dimension greater than one) is non-separable. For instance, a bosonic field can be naturally thought of as an element of a tensor product whose factors represent harmonic oscillators at each point of space. From this perspective, the natural state space of a boson might seem to be a non-separable space. However, it is only a small separable subspace of the full tensor product that can contain physically meaningful fields (on which the observables can be defined). Another non-separable Hilbert space models the state of an infinite collection of particles in an unbounded region of space. An orthonormal basis of the space is indexed by the density of the particles, a continuous parameter, and since the set of possible densities is uncountable, the basis is not countable.

Orthogonal complements and projections

Specifically,

This provides the geometrical interpretation of : it is the best approximation to x by elements of V.

The composite  is generally not a projection; in fact, the composite is a projection if and only if the two projections commute, and in that case .

By restricting the codomain to the Hilbert space , the orthogonal projection  gives rise to a projection mapping ; it is the adjoint of the inclusion mapping

meaning that

The operator norm of the orthogonal projection  onto a nonzero closed subspace  is equal to 1:

Every closed subspace V of a Hilbert space is therefore the image of an operator  of norm one such that . The property of possessing appropriate projection operators characterizes Hilbert spaces:

 A Banach space of dimension higher than 2 is (isometrically) a Hilbert space if and only if, for every closed subspace , there is an operator  of norm one whose image is  such that .

While this result characterizes the metric structure of a Hilbert space, the structure of a Hilbert space as a topological vector space can itself be characterized in terms of the presence of complementary subspaces:
 A Banach space  is topologically and linearly isomorphic to a Hilbert space if and only if, to every closed subspace , there is a closed subspace  such that  is equal to the internal direct sum .

The orthogonal complement satisfies some more elementary results. This result is a special case of the Hahn–Banach theorem. The orthogonal complement is thus a Galois connection on the partial order of subspaces of a Hilbert space. In general, the orthogonal complement of a sum of subspaces is the intersection of the orthogonal complements:

Spectral theory
There is a well-developed spectral theory for self-adjoint operators in a Hilbert space, that is roughly analogous to the study of symmetric matrices over the reals or self-adjoint matrices over the complex numbers. In the same sense, one can obtain a "diagonalization" of a self-adjoint operator as a suitable sum (actually an integral) of orthogonal projection operators.

The spectrum of an operator , denoted , is the set of complex numbers  such that  lacks a continuous inverse. If  is bounded, then the spectrum is always a compact set in the complex plane, and lies inside the disc . If  is self-adjoint, then the spectrum is real. In fact, it is contained in the interval  where

The eigenspaces of an operator  are given by

Unlike with finite matrices, not every element of the spectrum of  must be an eigenvalue: the linear operator  may only lack an inverse because it is not surjective. Elements of the spectrum of an operator in the general sense are known as spectral values. Since spectral values need not be eigenvalues, the spectral decomposition is often more subtle than in finite dimensions.

However, the spectral theorem of a self-adjoint operator  takes a particularly simple form if, in addition,  is assumed to be a compact operator. The spectral theorem for compact self-adjoint operators states:
 A compact self-adjoint operator  has only countably (or finitely) many spectral values. The spectrum of  has no limit point in the complex plane except possibly zero.

This theorem plays a fundamental role in the theory of integral equations, as many integral operators are compact, in particular those that arise from Hilbert–Schmidt operators.

The general spectral theorem for self-adjoint operators involves a kind of operator-valued Riemann–Stieltjes integral, rather than an infinite summation. The spectral family associated to  associates to each real number λ an operator , which is the projection onto the nullspace of the operator , where the positive part of a self-adjoint operator is defined by

The operators  are monotone increasing relative to the partial order defined on self-adjoint operators; the eigenvalues correspond precisely to the jump discontinuities. One has the spectral theorem, which asserts

In particular, one has the ordinary scalar-valued integral representation

A somewhat similar spectral decomposition holds for normal operators, although because the spectrum may now contain non-real complex numbers, the operator-valued Stieltjes measure  must instead be replaced by a resolution of the identity.

The resulting continuous functional calculus has applications in particular to pseudodifferential operators.

The spectral theory of unbounded self-adjoint operators is only marginally more difficult than for bounded operators. The spectrum of an unbounded operator is defined in precisely the same way as for bounded operators:  is a spectral value if the resolvent operator

fails to be a well-defined continuous operator. The self-adjointness of  still guarantees that the spectrum is real. Thus the essential idea of working with unbounded operators is to look instead at the resolvent  where  is nonreal. This is a bounded normal operator, which admits a spectral representation that can then be transferred to a spectral representation of  itself. A similar strategy is used, for instance, to study the spectrum of the Laplace operator: rather than address the operator directly, one instead looks as an associated resolvent such as a Riesz potential or Bessel potential.

A precise version of the spectral theorem in this case is:

There is also a version of the spectral theorem that applies to unbounded normal operators.

In popular culture 
In Gravity's Rainbow (1973), a novel by Thomas Pynchon, one of the characters is called  "Sammy Hilbert-Spaess", a pun on "Hilbert Space". The novel refers also to Gödel's incompleteness theorems.

See also

Remarks

Notes

References 

 .
 .
 .
 .
 .
 .
 .
 .
 .
 .
 .
 .
 .

 .
 .
 .
 .
 .
 .
 
 .
 .
 .
 .
 .
 .
 

 .
 .
 .
 .
 .
.
 .
 .
 .
 .
 .
  
 .
.
 .
 
 
 .
 .
 .
 .
 .
 .
 .
  
 .
 ; originally published Monografje Matematyczne, vol. 7, Warszawa, 1937.
  
 .
 .
 .
 .
 .
 .
 .
 .
 .
 .
 .
 .
 .
 .

External links

 
 Hilbert space at Mathworld
 245B, notes 5: Hilbert spaces by Terence Tao

 
Functional analysis
Linear algebra
Operator theory
Space